Nicklas Pedersen (born 10 October 1987) is a Danish former professional footballer who played as a forward. He is currently U17 manager at HB Køge.

Club career 
Pedersen started his senior career with Herfølge BK in the Danish 1st Division. He made his Denmark national under-21 football team debut in August 2007, and got his breakthrough with Danish Superliga club FC Nordsjælland in September 2007. In January 2009, Pedersen signed a contract with Dutch club FC Groningen. FC Groningen paid FC Nordsjælland €2.2 million for the Danish striker.

On 2 July 2012, Pedersen joined Belgian club K.V. Mechelen on a three-year contract.

On 1 July 2013, Pedersen joined fellow Belgian side K.A.A. Gent for a fee of €1.5 million.

On 14 May 2019 he was forced to retire due to a knee injury.

He is the son of the Danish football manager Jesper Pedersen.

Coaching career
In the summer 2019, Pedersen began working as talent coach for his former club, HB Køge, helping with the morning- and individual training. On 6 January 2020 the club announced, that he would take charge of the club's U17 squad.

Honours

Club
Gent
Belgian Pro League (1): 2014–15

International

International goals
Scores and results list Denmark's goal tally first.

References

Nicklas Pedersen rykker til Oostende, bold.dk, 1 February 2016

External links
National team profile
Danish Superliga statistics
HvemVandt.dk profile
Voetbal International profile 

1987 births
Living people
Danish men's footballers
Denmark youth international footballers
Denmark under-21 international footballers
Denmark international footballers
Herfølge Boldklub players
FC Nordsjælland players
Danish Superliga players
FC Groningen players
Eredivisie players
K.V. Mechelen players
K.A.A. Gent players
K.V. Oostende players
FC Emmen players
People from Køge Municipality
Belgian Pro League players
Danish expatriate men's footballers
Expatriate footballers in the Netherlands
Danish expatriate sportspeople in the Netherlands
Expatriate footballers in Belgium
Danish expatriate sportspeople in Belgium
UEFA Euro 2012 players
Association football forwards
Sportspeople from Region Zealand